This is a list of American mathematicians.

List
James Waddell Alexander II (1888–1971)
Stephanie B. Alexander, elected in 2014 as a fellow of the American Mathematical Society "for contributions to geometry, for high-quality exposition, and for exceptional teaching of mathematics"
Linda J. S. Allen
Ann S. Almgren, applied mathematician who works as a senior scientist and group leader of the Center for Computational Sciences and Engineering at the Lawrence Berkeley National Laboratory
Frederick Almgren (1933–1997)
Beverly Anderson (b. 1943)
Natascha Artin Brunswick (1909–2003)
Tamara Awerbuch-Friedlander
Wealthy Babcock (1895–1990)
Benjamin Banneker (1731–1806)
Augustin Banyaga (b. 1947)
Ruth Aaronson Bari (1917–2005)
Janet Barnett
Jon Barwise (1942–2000)
Richard Bellman (1920–1984)
Leonid Berlyand (b. 1957)
Leah Berman (b. 1976)
Manjul Bhargava (b. 1974)
George David Birkhoff (1884–1944)
David Blackwell (1919–2010)
Archie Blake (b. 1906)
Nathaniel Bowditch (1773–1838)
Felix Browder (1927–2016)
William Browder (b. 1934), pioneered the surgery theory method for classifying high-dimensional manifolds.
Marjorie Lee Browne (1914–1979), taught at North Carolina Central University
Robert Daniel Carmichael (1879–1967)
Sun-Yung Alice Chang (b. 1948), researcher in mathematical analysis 
Alonzo Church (1903–1995)
William Schieffelin Claytor (1908–1967), third African-American to earn a Ph.D. in Mathematics, University of Pennsylvania
Paul Cohen (1934–2007)
Don Coppersmith (b. 1950), cryptographer, first four-time Putnam Fellow in history
Elbert Frank Cox (1895–1969), first African-American to earn a Ph.D. in Mathematics, Cornell University
Laura Demarco (?), researcher in dynamical systems and complex analysis
Joseph J. Dennis (1905–1977), Clark College
Joseph L. Doob (1910–2004)
Jesse Douglas (1897–1965)
Samuel Eilenberg (1913–1998)
Noam Elkies (b. 1966), mathematical prodigy who works in computational number theory
Jerald Ericksen (1924–2021)
Alex Eskin (b. 1965), researcher in rational billiards and geometric group theory
Christina Eubanks-Turner, American mathematics educator, graph theorist, and commutative algebraist
Etta Zuber Falconer (1933–2002)
Benson Farb (b. 1965), researcher in geometric group theory and low-dimensional topology
Lisa Fauci, applied mathematician who applies computational fluid dynamics to biological processes 
Charles Fefferman (b. 1949)
Henry Burchard Fine (1858–1928)
Erica Flapan (b. 1956), researcher in low-dimensional topology and knot theory
Alfred Leon Foster (1904–1994)
Ralph Fox (1913–1973)
Michael Freedman (b. 1951)
Murray Gerstenhaber (b. 1927)
Andrew M. Gleason (1921–2008), WWII codebreaker, major contributor in solving Hilbert's 5th Problem ("restricted" version).
Thomas Godfrey (1704–1749)
Ralph E. Gomory (b. 1929)
Daniel Gorenstein (1923–1992)
Ronald Graham (1935–2020)
Evelyn Boyd Granville (b. 1924)
Phillip Griffiths (b. 1938), major contributor to complex manifold approach to algebraic geometry
Frank Harary (1921–2005)
Joe Harris (mathematician) (b. 1951), prolific researcher and expositor of algebraic geometry
Euphemia Haynes (1890–1980), first African-American woman to earn a Ph.D. in mathematics
Gloria Conyers Hewitt (b. 1935)
George William Hill (1838–1914)
Einar Hille (1894–1980)
Alston Scott Householder (1904–1993)
Nathan Jacobson (1910–1999)
Clifford Victor Johnson, awarded B.S. from Imperial College in 1989
Katherine Johnson (1918–2020)
Theodore Kaczynski (b. 1942)
Howard Jerome Keisler (b. 1936)
Victor Klee (1925–2007)
Holly Krieger
Harold W. Kuhn (1925–2014)
Kenneth Kunen (1943–2020)
Solomon Lefschetz (1884–1972)
Suzanne Lenhart (b. 1954) researcher in partial differential equations; president of the Association for Women in Mathematics, 2001-2003 
James Lepowsky (b. 1944)
Marie Litzinger (1899–1952), number theorist
Jacob Lurie (b. 1977), developed derived algebraic geometry
Saunders Mac Lane (1909–2005)
W. T. Martin (1911–2004)
William S. Massey (1920–2017)
John N. Mather (1942–2017)
J. Peter May (b. 1939), researcher in algebraic topology, category theory, homotopy theory, and the foundational aspects of spectra
Barry Mazur (b. 1937)
Curtis T. McMullen (b. 1958)
Elliott Mendelson (1931–2020)
Winifred Edgerton Merrill (1862–1951)
Kelly Miller (1863–1939)
Kenneth Millett (b. 1941)
John Milnor (b. 1931)
Susan Montgomery (b. 1943)
E. H. Moore (1862–1932)
Marston Morse (1892–1977)
George Mostow (1923–2017)
Frederick Mosteller (1916–2006)
David Mumford (b. 1937)
John Forbes Nash Jr. (1928–2015)
Walter Noll (1925–2017)
Michael O'Nan (1943–2017)
Richard Palais (b. 1931)
Benjamin Peirce (1809–1880)
Javier Perez-Capdevila (b. 1963)
Vera Pless (1931–2020), mathematician specialized in combinatorics and coding theory
Daniel Quillen (1940–2011)
Charles Reason (1818–1893)
Joseph Ritt (1893–1951)
Fred S. Roberts (b. 1943)
Herbert Robbins (1915–2001)
Julia Robinson (1919–1985), contributor to Hilbert's tenth problem
J. Barkley Rosser (1907–1989)
Gerald Sacks (1933–2019)
Thomas Jerome Schaefer
Dana Scott (b. 1932)
James Serrin (1926–2012)
Claude Shannon (1916–2001)
Isadore Singer (1924–2021)
Charles Coffin Sims (1938–2017)
George Seligman (b. 1927)
Stephen Smale (b. 1930)
Raymond Smullyan (1919–2017)
Edwin Spanier (1921–1996)
Norman Steenrod (1910–1971)
Elias M. Stein (1931–2018)
Clarence F. Stephens (1917–2018)
Lee Stiff (1949–2021) 
Marshall Harvey Stone (1903–1989)
Theodore Strong (1790–1869)
Terence Tao (b. 1975)
John Tate (1925–2019)
Jean Taylor (b. 1944)
John G. Thompson (b. 1932)
Sister Mary Domitilla Thuener (1880–1977)
William Thurston (1936–2012)
Clifford Truesdell (1919–2000)
John Tukey (1915–2000)
John Urschel (b. 1991)
Dorothy Vaughan (1910–2008)
Oswald Veblen (1880–1960)
Mary Shore Walker (1882–1952)
William C. Waterhouse (1941–2016)
Herbert Wilf (1931–2012)
J. Ernest Wilkins, Jr. (1923–2011)
Amie Wilkinson (b. 1968), researcher in dynamical systems, ergodic theory, chaos theory and semisimple Lie groups
Hassler Whitney (1907–1989)
Dudley Weldon Woodard (1881–1965), second African-American to earn a Ph.D. in Mathematics, University of Pennsylvania
Margaret H. Wright (b. 1944), first woman president of Society for Industrial and Applied Mathematics

References

Mathematicians
American